The Punjab Legislative Council (Abolition) Act, 1969 was a legislation in India, adopted in 1969. Through this legislation the Punjab Legislative Council was abolished. The Act also provides for matters supplemental, incidental and consequential as a result of the abolition of the Punjab Legislative Council. The law came into effect on 7 January 1970. Through this law, the legislature of Punjab became unicameral, omitting the word 'Punjab' from Article 168 of the Constitution of India (i.e. the article of the Constitution listing states with bicameral legislatures).

See also 
 Punjab Legislative Assembly

References

Acts of the Parliament of India 1969
Politics of Punjab, India